Clímaco Jacinto Zarauz Carrillo (24 February 1926 – 21 July 2017) was a Roman Catholic bishop.

Ordained to the priesthood in 1950, Zarauz Carrillo served as bishop of the Roman Catholic Diocese of Azogues, Ecuador, from 1990 until 2006.

Notes

1926 births
2017 deaths
20th-century Roman Catholic bishops in Ecuador
21st-century Roman Catholic bishops in Ecuador
Roman Catholic bishops of Azogues